Arlan may refer to:
Arlan, Krasnokamsky District, Republic of Bashkortostan
Aironet ARLAN, a family of wireless networking technologies
Mount Arlan, a mountain in Turkmenistan
Arlan Kokshetau, a Kazakhstani hockey club
Arlan's, an American discount store chain
Aralan, a village in northern Iran

Given name
 Arlan Andrews (born 1940), American engineer and science fiction author
 Arlan Hamilton, American venture capitalist
 Arlan Lerio (born 1976), Filipino boxer
 Arlan Meekhof (born 1959), American politician from Michigan
 Arlan Richardson, American medical professor
 Arlan Stangeland (1930– 2013), American politician from Minnesota

See also
Arland (disambiguation)
Arleen, a feminine name, also spelled Arlene
Arlen (disambiguation)
Arlyn